Anova Culinary (legally Anova Applied Electronics, Inc.) is a San Francisco-based smart kitchen company that provides connected cooking appliances, such as sous-vide devices, combi-ovens, and vacuum sealers for the home cook. In 2014, the company introduced the first Bluetooth-enabled sous vide cooking device, the Anova Precision Cooker, followed by a Wi-Fi-enabled version in 2015.

Anova was acquired by home appliance company Electrolux on February 6, 2017 for $250 million USD, the first multimillion-dollar acquisition of a smart kitchen brand.

History 
Anova Culinary was founded in 2013 by Stephen Svajian, Jeff Wu, and Natalie Vaughn. The company stemmed from a scientific equipment manufacturer of temperature control products for laboratories worldwide.

In 2010, Wu had an early proof of concept for an affordable home sous vide device and teamed up with Stephen Svajian, founder and CEO of marketing agency Get Fresh Inc. leading to the founding of Anova Culinary. In 2013, they shipped their first product, the Anova One.

Overview 

In 2013 the company showed the Anova One, the first sous-vide cooker built for the home cook; an immersion circulator clamped onto an existing pot that circulated water as it was heated.

In 2014 the Anova Precision Cooker was introduced, the first connected sous-vide device. It had a wand-like sous vide immersion circulator that attached to a pot or container, maintaining water at a precise temperature to cook food at a set time and temperature. It was Bluetooth-enabled and, when paired with the company's app, allowed cooks control of the machine through their mobile device.

The Anova Precision Cooker Nano supports Bluetooth-enabled multi-device communication through the Anova Culinary App, so that users can coordinate cooking cycles with multiple dishes using the company's products. It has the same control over temperature as other models. Basic controls are on the device itself for app-free control.

The Anova Precision Oven is a countertop Combi Oven (steam and convection) meant to work separate from (as a standalone sous vide solution) or in tandem with the existing Precision Cooker products.

The Anova Culinary App is the companion app to the firm's Precision Cooker, available on Android and iOS. The app is used to find recipes and for temperature control.

Acquisitions

Get Fresh, Inc. 
In 2015, Anova Culinary acquired marketing agency Get Fresh, Inc. for $9.2M USD.

Electrolux 
On February 6, 2017, Electrolux announced it agreed to acquire Anova Culinary for $250M USD, paying $115 million in cash up front and an additional $135 million for adjustments and achievement of certain financial objectives.

The Anova brand remains intact under the deal, retaining its own brand identity and the leadership of its CEO Stephan Svajian, existing as a part of the larger Electrolux umbrella. According to Business Insider,  Electrolux is reportedly establishing a "smart home solutions center" in San Francisco for the development of connected products in other categories.

Partnerships 
At the 2017 International Home and Housewares show, Anova announced a partnership with silicone bag creator Stasher to provide reusable and resealable bags for sous vide.  On July 25, 2017, the firm announced a partnership with Field Company offering a limited batch of the Field cast iron skillet before it was made available to the general public.

References 

Electrolux
American companies established in 2013
Companies based in San Francisco
Home automation companies
Kickstarter-funded products
2017 mergers and acquisitions